J. P. Macura (born June 5, 1995) is an American professional basketball player for Derthona Basket of the Italian Lega Basket Serie A (LBA). He played college basketball for Xavier University.

High school career
Macura attended Lakeville North High School in Lakeville, Minnesota. At the school, Macura won one MSHSL state title. Macura scored 1,811 points in his career, a school record. In his senior season, he averaged 32.2 points and 6.5 rebounds per game. Macura led his team to victory in the 2014 4A state tournament over Hopkins High School, and hit a buzzer beater 3 pointer to win the semifinal game over Cretin-Derham Hall High School. He received scholarship offers from Butler and Iowa State but committed to Xavier to compete in the Big East Conference.

College career
Macura made his first two collegiate starts at Villanova on January 14 and at Marquette on January 17. He recorded back-to-back double-figure scoring games for the first time in his Xavier career with an 11-point game at Marquette on February 10 and a 10-point game in the win over Providence on February 7. On March 13 against Georgetown, Macura scored eight points in just seven minutes of action, including going 2-of-2 from 3-point territory, before being forced out of the game with an ankle injury. He was forced to sit out the Big East Conference Championship game, but returned for the Ole Miss game on March 19 and hit two 3-pointers. He was seventh on the team in scoring with 5.4 points per game, and third on the team in steals with 26 (0.7 steals per game) in just 13.2 minutes per game.

Macura was voted the 2015-16 Big East Conference Sixth Man Award winner by the Big East coaches. He provided high energy with 9.4 points 2.6 rebounds and 1.1 steals per game on the season. In the last 15 games of the season, he averaged 10.6 points per game on 48.6 percent shooting, including 41.2 percent from 3-point territory. Macura scored in double figures in nine of the last 15 games and 16 for the season, including a team-high tying 19 points to go with three steals in the win over Villanova on February 24. He hit 80.7 percent from the free-throw line, although he didn't have enough attempts to be ranked in the Big East Conference (he would have been 10th). Macura had a season-high 20-point effort in 31 minutes of action versus Marquette on February 6 that included two clutch 3-pointers in the final four minutes.

In March 2016, Macura pulled down his pants and was caught with a fake ID in a Cincinnati bar. He was charged with disorderly conduct. On November 18, Macura scored a career-high 28 points in an 83–77 win over Clemson. He averaged 14.4 points per game as a junior.

As a senior, Macura received the nickname "Dennis the Menace” due to taunting opposing players. Whenever he received a crude tweet, he replied “Thank you, God Bless." He had 27 points against Seton Hall on January 20. Macura averaged 12.9 points per game on a 29-6 team that earned Xavier's first no. 1 seed in the NCAA Tournament. He finished his career with 1,491 points.

Professional career

Charlotte Hornets/Greensboro Swarm (2018–2019)
After going undrafted in the 2018 NBA draft, Macura signed a two-way contract with the Charlotte Hornets, splitting time between the Hornets and their G League affiliate the Greensboro Swarm. In his first game with the Swarm, he scored 27 points in a 114–98 win against the Wisconsin Herd. Macura made his NBA debut on January 2, 2019, in a 122–84 blowout loss to the Dallas Mavericks, recording 4 points, 2 rebounds, and 2 assists in 13 minutes of action.

Canton Charge (2019–2020)
Macura signed with the Cleveland Cavaliers in July 2019. He was released along with Sindarius Thornwell, Timothé Luwawu-Cabarrot and Daniel Hamilton on October 15, 2019. He later signed with the Cavaliers G League affiliate Canton Charge.

Cleveland Cavaliers (2020)
On February 9, 2020, the Cleveland Cavaliers announced that they had signed Macura to a 10-day contract. Macura appeared in one game for the Cavaliers before his contract expired.

Afyon Basket (2020–present)
On September 8, 2020, he has signed with Afyon Belediye of the Turkish Basketbol Süper Ligi. He averaged 12.9 points, 3.9 rebounds, 1.7 assist and 1.7 steals per game.

Derthona Basket (2021–present)
On July 24, 2021, Macura signed with Derthona Basket of the Lega Basket Serie A.

Career statistics

NBA

Regular season

|-
| style="text-align:left;"| 
| style="text-align;left;"| Charlotte
| 2 || 0 || 8.5 || .333 || .000 || - || 1.5 || 1.0 || .0 || .0 || 3.0
|-
| style="text-align:left;"| 
| style="text-align;left;"| Cleveland
| 1 || 0 || 1.0 || - || - || - || .0 || .0 || .0 || .0 || .0

|- class="sortbottom"
| style="text-align:center;" colspan="2"| Career
| 3 || 0 || 6.0 || .333 || .000 || - || 1.0 || .7 || .0 || .0 || 2.0

College

|-
| style="text-align:left;"| 2014–15
| style="text-align:left;"| Xavier
| 35 || 3 || 13.2 || .413 || .337 || .762 || 1.2 || .6 || .7 || .1 || 5.4
|-
| style="text-align:left;"| 2015–16
| style="text-align:left;"| Xavier
| 34 || 4 || 22.7 || .470 || .356 || .807 || 2.6 || 2.0 || 1.1 || .0 || 9.4
|-
| style="text-align:left;"| 2016–17
| style="text-align:left;"| Xavier
| 38 || 37 || 33.5 || .426 || .340 || .785 || 4.4 || 2.9 || 1.4 || .2 || 14.4
|-
| style="text-align:left;"| 2017–18
| style="text-align:left;"| Xavier
| 34 || 34 || 29.7 || .479 || .377 || .821 || 4.5 || 2.9 || 1.4 || .4 || 12.9
|- class="sortbottom"
| style="text-align:center;" colspan="2"| Career
| 141 || 78 || 25.0 || .448 || .352 || .798 || 3.2 || 2.1 || 1.2 || .2 || 10.6

Personal life
Macura is the son of Paul and Sue Ann Macura. His siblings are David and Kari.

On December 19, 2021, it was announced on Macura's Instagram that he and his longtime girlfriend are expecting a child due in April 2022.

References

1995 births
Living people
Afyonkarahisar Belediyespor players
American expatriate basketball people in Turkey
American men's basketball players
Basketball players from Minnesota
Canton Charge players
Charlotte Hornets players
Cleveland Cavaliers players
Greensboro Swarm players
People from Lakeville, Minnesota
Shooting guards
Sportspeople from the Minneapolis–Saint Paul metropolitan area
Undrafted National Basketball Association players
Xavier Musketeers men's basketball players